Francis Donald Nixon (November 23, 1914 – June 27, 1987) was a
younger brother of U.S. President Richard Nixon.

Family 
He was the third of five sons:

Harold Nixon (June 1, 1909 – March 7, 1933)
Richard Nixon (January 9, 1913 – April 22, 1994)
Donald Nixon (November 23, 1914 – June 27, 1987) 
Arthur Nixon (May 26, 1918 – August 10, 1925)
Edward Nixon (May 3, 1930  – February 27, 2019)

Life
Nixon married Clara Jane Lemke (1920–2013) in 1942 and had two sons, Richard C. Nixon and Donald A. Nixon, and a daughter, Lawrene Mae Nixon Anfinson.

In January 1957 Howard Hughes lent Nixon $205,000 to bail out his "Nixon's" drive-in restaurant in Whittier, California. The restaurant went bankrupt less than a year later. Questions about whether this was a political favor dogged Richard Nixon during his campaign for president and later when he sought the governorship of California.

Nixon never lived it down, and one of the many speculated motives for the 1972 Watergate burglary that ultimately led to Richard Nixon's resignation was a desire to find proof that the then-Democratic National Committee chairman Larry O'Brien was also secretly working for Hughes. John H. Meier, one of Hughes' former business advisors, in collaboration with former vice president Hubert Humphrey and others, was using Donald Nixon to feed misinformation to his brother, the President. Meier told Donald that he was sure the Democrats would win the election, since they had a lot of information on Richard Nixon's illicit dealings with Howard Hughes which had never been released, and that Larry O'Brien had the information

After becoming the U.S. President, Richard Nixon sent a White House investigator, Anthony Ulasewicz, to "rescue" Donald Nixon's son, Donald Nixon Jr., from a hippie commune in the California mountains. Political columnist Jack Anderson revealed the incident in his column of June 21, 1973, and wrote of Ulasewicz, "The burly former private eye persuaded Donald to trim his hair and to return home," and reported that White House aide John Erlichman admonished Donald Jr. in a two-hour lecture "to behave himself and do nothing to embarrass the President", his uncle Richard. <ref>"Nixon nephew once 'rescued' from hippies", Birmingham (AL) Post-Herald", June 21, 1973, p. 11</ref>

In 1974 the staff of the Senate Watergate committee disclosed additional information to support the charge that Charles Rebozo gave or lent part of a $100,000 campaign contribution to President Nixon's personal secretary, Rose Mary Woods, and to Nixon's brothers, Donald and Edward Nixon.

Media portrayals
Donald Nixon was portrayed by Sean Stone in the 1995 Oliver Stone film Nixon''.

Death
On June 27, 1987, Donald Nixon died while undergoing hospital treatment for pneumonia. He was 72 years old.

References

External links 
Nixon Fun Facts via Nixon Foundation

1914 births
1987 deaths
Nixon family
People from Whittier, California
20th-century American politicians
Burials at Rose Hills Memorial Park